Aethlius or Aithlios (Ancient Greek: Ἀέθλιος means "winning the prize") or Aethnos was, in Greek mythology, the first king of Elis.

Family 
Aethlius was the son of Zeus and Protogeneia (daughter of Deucalion), and was married to Calyce by whom he fathered Endymion. According to some accounts, Endymion was himself a son of Zeus and first king of Elis. Other traditions again made Aethlius a son of Aeolus, who was called by the name of Zeus.

Mythology 
Aethlius led Aeolians from Thessaly and founded Elis. According to Eusebius, as a means of challenging his sons, Aethlius use the concept of Olympics of the Idaean Dactyls and it was from his name that the adversaries are called athletes. After Aethlius, his sons Epeius and then Endymion, Alexinus and Oenomaus were each in charge of the sacrifices connected with the festival.

Notes

References 

 Apollodorus, The Library with an English Translation by Sir James George Frazer, F.B.A., F.R.S. in 2 Volumes, Cambridge, MA, Harvard University Press; London, William Heinemann Ltd. 1921. . Online version at the Perseus Digital Library. Greek text available from the same website.
Conon, Fifty Narrations, surviving as one-paragraph summaries in the Bibliotheca (Library) of Photius, Patriarch of Constantinople translated from the Greek by Brady Kiesling. Online version at the Topos Text Project.
Gaius Julius Hyginus, Fabulae from The Myths of Hyginus translated and edited by Mary Grant. University of Kansas Publications in Humanistic Studies. Online version at the Topos Text Project.
 Pausanias, Description of Greece with an English Translation by W.H.S. Jones, Litt.D., and H.A. Ormerod, M.A., in 4 Volumes. Cambridge, MA, Harvard University Press; London, William Heinemann Ltd. 1918. . Online version at the Perseus Digital Library
Pausanias, Graeciae Descriptio. 3 vols. Leipzig, Teubner. 1903.  Greek text available at the Perseus Digital Library.

Kings of Elis
Kings in Greek mythology
Deucalionids
Children of Zeus
Demigods in classical mythology
Thessalian characters in Greek mythology
Elean mythology